Triathlon at the 2010 Asian Beach Games was held at 16 December 2010 in Muscat, Oman.

Medalists

Medal table

Results

Men's individual
16 December

Women's individual
16 December

References 

 Men's results
 Women's results

External links 
Official Site

2010 Asian Beach Games events
Asian Beach Games
2010 Asian